Honus Wagner is a bronze statue by Frank Vittor, created to honor former Pittsburgh Pirates shortstop Honus Wagner. It is located at PNC Park, Pittsburgh, Pennsylvania.

History
It was dedicated on April 30, 1955, at Schenley Park, Pittsburgh, Pennsylvania. The statue was relocated in 1972, and rededicated on July 21, 1972, at Three Rivers Stadium, 400 Stadium Circle, Gate C, Pittsburgh, Pennsylvania.

References

1954 establishments in Pennsylvania
1954 sculptures
Baseball culture
Bronze sculptures in Pennsylvania
Monuments and memorials in Pittsburgh
Outdoor sculptures in Pennsylvania
Sculptures of men in Pennsylvania
Statues in Pennsylvania
Statues of sportspeople
Cultural depictions of baseball players
Cultural depictions of American men